Pseudothyretes mariae is a moth in the subfamily Arctiinae. It was described by Abel Dufrane in 1945. It is found in the Democratic Republic of the Congo.

References

Moths described in 1945
Syntomini